A cormorant is a kind of sea bird.

Cormorant may also refer to:

Music
 Cormorant (band), a San Francisco Bay Area progressive metal band

Aircraft
 The CH-149 Cormorant, a Canadian Forces helicopter
 The Lockheed Martin Cormorant, a cancelled Lockheed Martin project
 The Tactical Robotics Cormorant, a flying car unmanned aerial vehicle built by Tactical Robotics Ltd., subsidiary of Urban Aeronautics Ltd.

Computing
 The Cormorant Network, a British Army Strategic Communications System.

Literature and film
 The Cormorant, a 1986 novel (and later film) by Stephen Gregory
 The Cormorant, a 2013 novel by Chuck Wendig

Places
 Cormorant, Manitoba
 Cormorant Township, Becker County, Minnesota
 Cormorant oilfield, an oilfield in North Sea

Ships
 HMS Cormorant, the name of various ships of the British Royal Navy
 USS Cormorant, the name of more than one ship of the United States Navy
 Q.G.S. Cormorant 1900–1955, a Queensland, Australia, Pilot boat, based in Brisbane.
 P677 Cormoran 1995 - a Flamant class patrol vessel of the French Navy
 German Auxilluary Cruiser Kormoran (1938), a Kriegsmarine commerce raider

Horse
Cormorant (horse), (1974–2007), American Thoroughbred racehorse

See also
 Cormoran
 Kormoran